Qoʻytosh is an urban-type settlement in Gʻallaorol District, Jizzakh Region, Uzbekistan. The town population in 1989 was 5178 people.

References

Populated places in Jizzakh Region
Urban-type settlements in Uzbekistan